Tatsoi (Brassica rapa subsp. narinosa or Brassica rapa var. rosularis) is an Asian variety of Brassica rapa grown for greens. Also called tat choy, it is closely related to the more familiar Bok Choy. This plant has become popular in North American cuisine as well, and is now grown throughout the world.

Naming
The name comes from Cantonese 塌菜 taap3 coi3 or "drooping vegetable", often rendered 'tat soi', 'tat choy'. However, its natural habitat is alongside the Yangtze River, where it is called 塌棵菜 (Shanghai and around Lake Tai, Wu taku tse), 烏塌菜 (Lake Tai and Nanking, Wu wu-thaq tshe, literally "dark drooping veggie"). Mandarin borrowed the name 塌棵菜 (Pinyin tā kē cài). It is also called 'Chinese flat cabbage', 'rosette pakchoi' or 'broadbeaked mustard', 'spoon mustard', or 'spinach mustard'.

Description
The plant has dark green spoon-shaped leaves which form a thick rosette. It has a soft creamy texture and has a subtle yet distinctive flavour.

Planting
It can be grown to harvestable size in 45–50 days, and can withstand temperatures down to –10 °C (15 °F). Tatsoi can even be harvested from under snow.

Days to Maturity: 45
When to Sow
 Outside: As early as the soil can be worked. Sow again in late summer or fall.
 Inside: Sow directly outdoors.
Seed Depth: 1/4" to 1/2"
Seed Spacing: 6"
Row Spacing: 18"
Days to Emerge: 5 - 15
Thinning: When 4" tall, thin to 6" apart.

Nutritional value
Tatsoi contains high levels of vitamin C, carotenoids, folic acid, calcium and potassium.

Cooking
Tatsoi is used for pesto, salads, stir frys and garnishing soup.  According to Food52, "Tatsoi is a very versatile green, equally suited to being served raw or lightly cooked. To make it easy, just use tatsoi anywhere you’d use spinach. Lightly steam or sauté it, wilt the leaves with a warm dressing, or add them to a soup at the end of cooking."

The leaves are similar to romaine, while the stalks taste a little like cucumber, with a mild bitterness. Leaves and inner stalk are tender; outer stalk is typically discarded. Typical cooking is to stir fry the leaves and the stalks. They also can be pickled.

References

Brassica
Leaf vegetables